{{DISPLAYTITLE:6-Diazo-5-oxo-L-norleucine}}

6-Diazo-5-oxo-L-norleucine (DON) is a glutamine antagonist, which was isolated originally from Streptomyces in a sample of Peruvian soil. This diazo compound is biosynthesized from lysine by three enzymes in bacteria. It is one of the most famous non-proteinogenic amino acid and was characterized in 1956 by Henry W Dion et al., who suggested a possible use in cancer therapy. This antitumoral efficacy was confirmed in different animal models. DON was tested as chemotherapeutic agent in different clinical studies, but was never approved. In 2019, DON was shown to kill tumor cells while reversing disease symptoms and improve overall survival in late-stage experimental glioblastoma in mice, when combined with calorie-restricted ketogenic diet.

Chemistry 
DON is a water-soluble yellowish powder, which can be dissolved also in aqueous solutions of methanol, acetone or ethanol, but dissolution in absolute alcohols is difficult. Solutions of at least 50 μM DON in 0.9% NaCl are lightly yellowish. The crystalline form appears as yellowish greenish needles. The specific rotation is [α]26D +21° (c = 5.4% in H2O). In phosphate buffer, pH 7 are the ultraviolet absorption maxima at 274 nm (E1%1 cm. 683) and 244 nm (E1%1 cm 376).

Biochemistry 
DON is used as inhibitor of different glutamine utilizing enzymes. Due to its similarity to glutamine it can enter catalytic centres of these enzymes and inhibits them by covalent binding, or more precisely by alkylation. The following table gives a survey of DON targets.

Pharmacology 
DON is a cytotoxic inhibitor of many enzymes of nucleotide synthesis. It could be shown in vitro that DON treatment led to apoptosis, the programmed cell death. Different pathways were investigated. So it could be shown that the inner mitochondrial membrane was damaged, and single strand DNA breaks were observed. The exact mode of action remains unclear and needs further research.

DON is not approved as pharmaceutical agent, but is tested in combination with a recombinant glutaminase in clinical trials for the treatment of different solid tumors.

References 

Experimental cancer drugs
Amino acids
Diazo compounds
Conjugated ketones